Lokendra Singh may refer to:

Lokendra Singh (polo player), Indian polo player
Lokendra Singh (politician) (1976-2018), Indian politician, member of the 16th Legislative Assembly of Uttar Pradesh